Reginald Munger Sullivan "Eric" Bjornstad (1934–2014) was an American climber and author, and poet noted for his many climbs in the desert southwest as well as climbs in the Pacific Northwest and Alaska.

Selected bibliography

1988. Desert Rock. Chockstone Press, Evergreen, CO. .

References

1934 births
2014 deaths
American rock climbers
American male writers
20th-century American people